Sir Green Hat and the Wizard is a 1974 anthology of 14 fairy tales from around the world that have been collected and retold by Ruth Manning-Sanders. It is one in a long series of such anthologies by Manning-Sanders.

Table of contents
1. Sir Green Hat and the Wizard (Denmark)
2. The Little Jizo (Japan)
3. The Tailor and the Hunter (Austria)
4. The Porridge Pot (Hanover)
5. The Blue-grey Fleece (Mongolia)
1. The Old Man and Woman
2. The Yellow-headed Swans
6. The Crane's Purse (Russia)
7. Voo-too-koo (Zulu, South Africa)
8. Hassan the Ropemaker (Arabia)
9. The All-seeing Sun (Sicily)
10. Pippi Menou and the Hanging Palace (Brittany)
11. Plain Peter (Bavaria)
12. The Glassy Bridge (Pomerania)
13. Gold Lambs and Silver Lambs (Slavonia)
14. Vanka (Russia)

Collections of fairy tales
Children's short story collections
Methuen Publishing books
1974 short story collections
1974 children's books
1974 anthologies